All Alone is a 1967 album by André Previn.

Reception
The initial Billboard magazine review from May 1967 included the album as a 'Pop Special Merit' pick and wrote that "Previn plays the romantic standards simply and effectively. He doesn't showboat but stays pretty much with the melodies as they were written".

Track listing
"More Than You Know" (Edward Eliscu, Billy Rose, Vincent Youmans) – 2:10
"I Got It Bad (and That Ain't Good)" (Duke Ellington, Paul Francis Webster) – 2:20
"Everything Happens to Me" (Matt Dennis, Tom Adair) – 2:37
"You Are Too Beautiful"  (Richard Rodgers, Lorenz Hart) – 3:42
"How Deep Is the Ocean?" (Irving Berlin) – 3:14 
"Angel Eyes" (Dennis, Earl Brent) – 2:57
"When Sunny Gets Blue" (Marvin Fisher, Jack Segal) – 2:42
"As Time Goes By" (Herman Hupfeld) – 2:33
"Remember Me?" (Harry Warren, Al Dubin) – 3:37
"Yesterdays" (Jerome Kern, Otto Harbach) – 3:34
"Dancing on the Ceiling" (Rodgers, Hart) – 2:52
"Here's That Rainy Day" (Jimmy Van Heusen, Johnny Burke) – 3:00

Personnel
André Previn – piano
Hank Cicalo – engineer
Leonard Feather – liner notes
Joe Reisman – producer

References

1967 albums
André Previn albums
RCA Victor albums
Solo piano jazz albums